Matrimony.com Limited, whose flagship brand is BharatMatrimony, is a network of matchmaking services. More than 4000 employees work at over 20 offices across India. The company also has offices in the US and Dubai.

Company details
BharatMatrimony operates in 15 regional languages. The company has pioneered several matrimony-related services such as Assistedmatrimony, a personalized matchmaking service for busy professionals where a trained relationship manager does the matches and facilitates meetings between prospects.  Its premium service, Elite Matrimony, offers matchmaking services for the upper crust that ensures privacy and confidentiality during the process.

History
In 2005 BharatMatrimony launched BharatMatrimony Centres, its offline division. The company pioneered the personal assisted service in 2008 with the launch of BM Privilege. This was then renamed Privilege Matrimony in 2009. Later it became Assisted Matrimony. Trained relationship managers understand member preferences, search for matching profiles and send them to members. They then contact prospects and facilitate meetings on mutual consent of prospective families.

Elite Matrimony

"Elite Matrimony", launched in 2008, caters to wealthy individuals or their families seeking matrimonial alliances, and is a part of Matrimony.com's premium matchmaking service.  The website employs staff who assist members in searching for potential partners, and its services are available only to invited members who must pay a matchmaking service fee ranging from 60,000 rupees to over 2,220,000 rupees.  The site was founded in 2008 by Murugavel Janakiraman in Chennai.

Developments
In 2012, the company came out with Matrimony Directory, a wedding vendors classifieds portal It features over 50,000 wedding related services in over 20 cities.

BharatMatrimony has mobile apps for iPhone, iPad, BlackBerry, Nokia and Android users in India. It also has an upgraded WAP site. Community Matrimony also has mobile apps.

Back in the early 2000s, when there was skepticism about online matrimony and fear about paying online, the company pioneered doorstep collections in India. The company introduced features on their website like Matchboard, SoulMate Search, AstroMatch, and Express Interest to help customers make the right matches.

In 2006, Bharat Matrimony earned an entry in the Limca Book of World Records for having facilitated the highest number of documented marriages online in India.

In 2013, Consim Info changed name to Matrimony.com

In 2021, Matrimony launched Jodii App which is a vernacular matchmaking app for lower income groups and blue-collared workers. Currently the App is available in Tamil but will soon be launched in other regional languages.

In 2022, Matrimony.com started 'RainbowLuv' to cater to people from the LGBTQIA+ community who are looking for serious and meaningful relationships. The app has 45 gender identities, 122 orientation tags and 48 pronouns

Awards
 Bharat Matrimony TV commercial rated among top 10 Ads of 2013
 Ranked India's most trusted matrimony brand
 Best PE/ VC backed consumer internet company!
 Wins Red Herring 100 Global Award

References

Indian matrimonial websites